James Daly, 1st Baron Dunsandle and Clanconal (1 April 1782 – 7 August 1847) was an Irish politician.

Background
Daly was the eldest son of Denis Daly and Lady Henrietta, daughter of Robert Maxwell, 1st Earl of Farnham and Henrietta Cantillon, widow of the 3rd Earl of Stafford. The Right Reverend Robert Daly was his younger brother.

Education

Daly was educated at Trinity College, Dublin.

Political career
Daly was elected Member of Parliament for Galway Borough in 1805, a seat he held until 1811. In 1812 he was returned for County Galway, a constituency he represented until 1830 and again from 1832 to 1835. He saw the waning of Daly's influence in the political representation of both the borough and county of Galway, at the national level. A Tory, he represented the county until 1833 when he lost his seat to Catholic representatives. For his long years of Tory support, in 1845 he was raised to the Peerage of Ireland as Baron Dunsandle and Clanconal, of Dunsandle in the County of Galway. Daly served as Mayor of Galway for a number of terms, 1804–5, 1810–11, 1814–15, 1818–20, and 1822–6.

Land-holding
James Daly owned at least three estates in Co Galway by the second decade of the 19th century, known as the Dunsandle, Lismore and Kilconnell estates. Various annuities were charged on the Lismore and Kilconnell estates to repay loans. In 1831 he borrowed £42,000 from the Alliance Co to pay off some of his siblings' younger children portions, created by the terms of his parents' marriage settlement 1780. However the charges on the Daly estates were still very large in 1841, amounting to a total of £94,539 <ref. Galway: James Hardiman Library: LE13/20, and in 1846 James Daly, by then Baron Dunsandle, borrowed a further £120,000 from the Globe Insurance Co.    James Lord Dunsandle died of typhus in 1847.

Family
Lord Dunsandle and Clanconal married Maria Elizabeth, daughter of Sir Skeffington Smyth, 1st Baronet and Margaret Daly in 1808. They had seven children. He died in August 1847, aged 65, and was succeeded in the barony by his eldest son, Denis. Lady Dunsandle and Clanconal died in November 1866.

References

External links 
 

Dunsandle and Clanconal, James
Dunsandle and Clanconal, James
Members of the Parliament of the United Kingdom for County Galway constituencies (1801–1922)
UK MPs 1802–1806
UK MPs 1806–1807
UK MPs 1807–1812
UK MPs 1812–1818
UK MPs 1818–1820
UK MPs 1820–1826
UK MPs 1826–1830
UK MPs 1832–1835
UK MPs who were granted peerages
Daly, 1st Baron Dunsandle and Clanconal, James
Dunsandle and Clanconal, James
Dunsandle
Mayors of Galway
Alumni of Trinity College Dublin